United Nations Security Council Resolution 12, adopted on December 10, 1946, decided that Greece and Yugoslavia will be invited to participate without the right to vote, that Albania and Bulgaria will be invited to make declarations before the Council and that at a later stage Albania and Bulgaria may be invited to participate without the right to vote.

Paragraphs 1 and 2 were adopted unanimously, while paragraph 3 was adopted "by a majority vote". No vote was taken on the resolution as a whole.

The "Greek Question" was first brought up by the Soviet Union in January 1946 after allegations of interference in Greece's internal affairs by British troops caused tensions with other countries in the region.

See also
 List of United Nations Security Council Resolutions 1 to 100 (1946–1953)

References

External links
 
Text of the Resolution at undocs.org

 0012
1946 in Yugoslavia 
1946 in Bulgaria  
1946 in Greece
1946 in Albania
 0012
 0012
 0012
 0012
December 1946 events